The 1860 Philadelphia mayoral election saw the reelection of Alexander Henry.

This was the first Philadelphia mayoral election won by the then-young Republican Party. Henry had previously been elected as a member of the "People's Party".

Results

References

1860
Philadelphia
Philadelphia mayoral
19th century in Philadelphia